Nyassang Forest Park  is a forest park in the Gambia. Established on January 1, 1954, it covers 2347 hectares.

It is located in Central River, Gambia. The estimate terrain elevation above sea level is 11 metres.

References

Protected areas established in 1954
Forest parks of the Gambia